David Motiuk (born January 13, 1962 in Vegreville, Alberta) is the bishop of the Ukrainian Catholic Eparchy of Edmonton. He was ordained a priest on 21 August 1988 and was ordained a bishop in Winnipeg on 11 June 2002. He was appointed Eparchial Bishop of Edmonton on 25 January 2007 and installed on 24 March 2007. On January 16, 2020, he was appointed an Apostolic Administrator of the Eparchy of New Westminster. He holds a doctorate in Eastern Catholic canon law from the Pontifical Oriental Institute in Rome.

Scholarly work

In October 2014, Daley presented "An Overview of the Ukrainian Catholic Church on the Eve of the Second Vatican Council" at the conference "The Vatican II Decree on the Eastern Catholic Churches, Orientalium ecclesiarum - Fifty Years Later" organized by the Metropolitan Andrey Sheptytsky Institute of Eastern Christian Studies held at the University of Toronto.

References

External links

Catholic Hierarchy Entry
Official Biography

Living people
1962 births
Canadian people of Ukrainian descent
Canadian members of the Ukrainian Greek Catholic Church
Bishops of the Ukrainian Greek Catholic Church in Canada
People from Vegreville